The 1925 Northern Ireland general election was held on 3 April 1925. It was the second election to the Parliament of Northern Ireland.  It saw significant losses for the Ulster Unionist Party, although they maintained their large majority. This was the last election for the Stormont parliament conducted using the Proportional Representation system. It was abolished by the Ulster Unionist government during this parliament and replaced with the first-past-the-post system used in Great Britain.

Results

|}

Electorate 611,683 (512,264 in contested seats); Turnout: 75.1% (384,745).

Votes summary

Seats summary

Notes

References

Northern Ireland Parliamentary Election Results 

1925
Northern Ireland general election
Northern Ireland general election
1925 elections in Northern Ireland